Robert Ide Will (April 20, 1925 – October 14, 2019) was an American rower who competed in the 1948 Summer Olympics. He was born in Seattle, Washington. In 1948, he was a crew member of the American boat which won the gold medal in the coxed fours event.

References 

 

1925 births
2019 deaths
American male rowers
Medalists at the 1948 Summer Olympics
Olympic gold medalists for the United States in rowing
Rowers at the 1948 Summer Olympics